The 2018 Pan American Surf Games, also referred to as PASA Games 2018 and officially named 2018 Pan American Claro Games for sponsorship reasons, was the fourteenth edition of the Pan American Surf Games the main competition organized by the Pan American Surf Association. It was held at Punta Rocas Beach in Punta Negra District, Lima, Peru from 2 to 8 December 2018.

270 athletes from 20 national teams competes in 8 surfing events; comprising Open (shortboard), Longboard, SUP surf and SUP race each for men and women.

Defending champions Peru won the competition for the fifth time with a total of 12,502 points and 2 out of the 8 gold medals at stake. Brazil finished second with 11,953 points and 1 gold medal. Argentina (9,986 points) and Costa Rica (9,623 points and 1 gold medal) were third and fourth respectively.

Schedule
The games were held over a 7-day period, from 2 to 8 December. The opening ceremony took place on 2 December, with the competitions starting on 3 December.

Participating nations
20 out of the 26 national associations affiliated to Pan American Surf Association entered the competition. Each nation was able to enter a maximun of 20 surfers (10 men and 10 women), with up to 4 surfers per gender in the Open event and up to 2 surfers per gender in each Longboard, SUP surf and SUP race events.

Medal table

Results

Men's events

Women's events

Final ranking per teams
The final ranking per teams was drawn up by adding each surfer's individual points earning in the events in which they competed. Surfers obtained points according to the final position they occupied in each event. In Open, Longboard and SUP surf events, the surfers eliminated before the final occupied a certain position, as follows:

Eliminated in round 1 (Open events): 33th place (3rd place of each heat) and  49th place (4th place of each heat)
Eliminated in round 1 (Longboard and SUP surf) and round 2 (Open): 17th place (3rd place of each heat) and 25th place (4th place of each heat)
Eliminated in quarter-finals: 9th place (3rd place of each heat) and 13th place (4th place of each heat)
Eliminated in semi-finals: 5th place (3rd place of each heat) and 7th place (4th place of each heat)

Non-initiators and non-finishers surfers received zero points. Points awarded according to the position were as follows:

The first place of the final ranking per teams was declared as the champion team of the 2018 Pan American Surf Games.

External links
2018 Pan American Surf Games at PASA website.
Final results summary

References

Pan American Surf Games